IUSD may refer to:
 Indiana University School of Dentistry
 Irvine Unified School District